The  (OGAE) is a non-governmental and non-profit international organisation, consisting of 42 Eurovision Song Contest fan clubs from across Europe and beyond. It was founded in 1984 in Savonlinna, Finland by Jaripekka Koikkalainen.

Four non-profit competitions are organised by the OGAE every year to promote national popular music to Eurovision fans around the world. The organisation also works frequently in co-operation with the European Broadcasting Union (EBU) and national broadcasters from the participating countries in order to help promote the Eurovision Song Contest.

The current President of the OGAE International Network is Simon Bennett from OGAE United Kingdom, who succeeded Maiken Mäemets of OGAE Finland in 2015.

History 
The Eurovision Song Contest began in 1956, and in 1984 the OGAE International Network was founded by Jaripekka Koikkalainen in Savonlinna, Finland. The organisation, which is an independent Eurovision fan club, operates as a non-governmental, non-political and non-profit body, and works frequently in cooperation with the European Broadcasting Union (EBU). The network is open to countries that take part in the Eurovision Song Contest or have participated in the past. Several other countries around Europe and beyond that do not have their own independent OGAE Network, including Kazakhstan, Monaco, San Marino, South Africa, and the United States of America, participate under the name "OGAE Rest of the World".

Every year, the organisation arranges four competitions – Song Contest, Second Chance Contest, Video Contest and Home Composed Song Contest. The cooperative exercise of the OGAE Network is to raise awareness of popular national music across the world, in collaboration with the fans of the Eurovision Song Contest, as well as establishing a strong relationship between national broadcasting companies and the marketing of the Eurovision Song Contest itself to a wider fan-base.

In 2007, Antonis Karatzikos was elected as new International Coordinator for the OGAE, until 2009. In July 2009 he was re-elected for the same post. In 2011, OGAE International Network became a registered organisation in France, and Maiken Mäemets was elected president. She was re-elected for a second term on 17 May 2013 at the Euro Fan Café (Moriska Paviljongen) in Malmö, Sweden. During the annual OGAE Presidents’ Meeting, which took place on 22 May 2015 at the Euro Fan Café in Vienna, the presidents of the OGAE Clubs elected a new board for the OGAE International Network (shown below), who would maintain their roles until the next election in 2017.

OGAE branches 
OGAE currently has forty-four members, including two in Germany. These are:

 
 
 
 
 
 
 
 
 
 
 
 
 
 
 
 
 
  Germany Eurovision Club
 
 
 
 
 
 
 
 
 
 
 
 
 
 
 
  Rest of the World

OGAE Rest of the World 
Countries that do not have an OGAE Network in their own right, but are active or associate members of the EBU are unified under the name "Rest of the World".  The countries which constitute this OGAE Network are: 

 
 
 
 
 
 
 
 
 
 
 
 
 
 
 
 
 
 
 
 
 
 
 
 
 
 
 
 
 
 
 
 
 
 
 
 
 
 
 
 

Notes
2. Bosnia and Herzegovina, Georgia, Moldova, Monaco, Montenegro, Morocco, San Marino and Slovakia have all participated in the Eurovision Song Contest, though they do not have full OGAE membership and thus are part of OGAE Rest of the World.

OGAE Contests

OGAE Poll 
The Marcel Bezençon Fan Award was handed out in 2002 and 2003, and voted on by members of the OGAE. It was discontinued and replaced by the Composer Award in 2004.

Every year since 2007, the OGAE has conducted a pre-Eurovision Song Contest poll in which every national club plus OGAE Rest of the World cast a vote from all entries participating in a particular contest, using the same scoring system as the one at Eurovision: the most voted songs on each club receive 1 to 8, and then 10 and 12 points, and countries cannot vote for themselves. The winners of this poll are:

OGAE Second Chance Contest 

The OGAE Second Chance Contest is a visual event which was founded in 1987 and is organised by branches of the OGAE. Four nations competed in the first contest which took place in 1987. The competition was previously a non-televised event, but evolved over the years by the usage of video tape and later DVD, YouTube and streaming services.

Each summer following the Eurovision Song Contest, each branch can enter one song that failed to win the country's national selection process for the contest. The members of each club choose amongst the songs that did not win and select one to represent the club in the event. Votes are cast by members of the OGAE clubs and are returned to the OGAE branch organising the particular year's event. Guest juries have been used to cast votes since 1993.

OGAE Song Contest 
The OGAE Song Contest is an audio event in which all OGAE national clubs can enter with an original song released in the previous 12 months in their countries. The competing songs must be sung in one of the country's official languages. This rule was planned to be removed in 2022, before the event was cancelled that year due to the controversy surrounding OGAE Russia's continued participation against the backdrop of the 2022 Russian invasion of Ukraine.

Participation
So far 59 countries have been represented at the contest at least once. These are listed here alongside the year in which they made their debut:

OGAE Rest of the World represents countries that do not have an OGAE branch of their own.

Winners
Fourteen countries have won the contest since it began in 1986. The most successful country in the contest is the United Kingdom, who have won the contest seven times.

OGAE Video Contest 
The OGAE Video Contest is a video event which, much like the OGAE Song Contest, is organised between branches of the OGAE. All OGAE national clubs can enter with an original song and video released in the previous 12 months in their countries. There is no obligation on the entry for the OGAE Video Contest to be sung in one of the country's official languages.

Participation
So far 50 countries have been represented at the contest at least once. These are listed here alongside the year in which they made their debut:

OGAE Rest of the World represents countries that do not have an OGAE branch of their own. Their first participation came at the 2005 contest, where they represented Kazakhstan.

Winners
Nine countries have won the contest since it began in 2003. The most successful countries in the contest has been France, who has won the contest four times.

See also 

 ABU Song Festivals
 Bundesvision Song Contest
 Cân i Gymru
 Caribbean Song Festival
 Eurovision Dance Contest
 Eurovision Song Contest
 Eurovision Young Dancers
 Eurovision Young Musicians
 Intervision Song Contest
 Junior Eurovision Song Contest
 OGAE Second Chance Contest
 OGAE Video Contest
 Sopot International Song Festival
 Turkvision Song Contest

Notes

References

External links 
 OGAE Home Page

 
Song contests
Non-profit organisations based in Finland
International organisations based in Finland